Beever is a surname and may refer to:

Alex Beever (born 1973), British rower
Julian Beever (born c. 1959), British chalk artist 
Mary Beever (1802–1883), British artist and botanist
Ross Beever (1946–2010), New Zealand geneticist and mycologist

See also
Beevers - English surname
Beaver - an animal

Surnames from nicknames